Mark Arnold (born December 23, 1961) is an American punk rock singer and guitarist, best known for two band projects Big Drill Car (1987–1995) and All Systems Go! (post-1995).

References

1966 births
Living people
American punk rock guitarists
American punk rock singers
20th-century American guitarists
21st-century American guitarists